"REACH", formerly known as Reach for the Rainbow (RFTR), was a registered charity serving children and young adults with developmental and physical disabilities in Ontario, Canada, founded in 1983 by Donna Trella.

The organization filed for bankruptcy in 2019.

The agency's integrated programs were designed to provide an opportunity for children and youth with physical and/or developmental disabilities living at home to participate in integrated summer camps and community programs.

Each summer, this non-profit organization worked with a Canadian Camp to provide the support necessary to meet the needs of disabled children from ages 6–16 to give them a camper experience. REACH worked with a variety of overnight camps since its establishment. These include: Cairn-Glen Mhor (1988), John Island Camp (1989), Pearce Williams Christian Centre (1992), Canterbury Hills Overnight Camp (1993), Camp Kitchikewana (1993), Camp Pine Crest (1993), Camp Wanakita (1994), Ryerson Camp (1997), Silver Lake Camp (1997), Cave Springs Camp (1999), Lambton Centre (2000), Camp Presqu'ile	(2001), Camp Ko-Mo-Kee (2003), Forest Cliff Camps (2005), Hidden Bay Leadership Camp (2005), RKY Camp (2005), Camp Maple Leaf (2017), Hockey Opportunity Camp (2017), and Camp Menesetung (2017).

"REACH" was supported by the following companies and foundations: Air Canada Foundation, Alice & Murray Maitland Foundation, CIBC Children’s Foundation, Cadillac Fairview, Crayola Canada, Elementary Teachers’ Federation of Ontario, Harry E. Foster Charitable Foundation, Hughes Amys, J.W. McConnell Family Foundation and the Social Innovation Generation (SiG), Isberg Charitable Trust, Kildare Trust Foundation, The Lillian Meighen and Don Wright Foundation, Marion Ethel & Frederick John Kamm Foundation, The McLean Foundation, Ontario Trillium Foundation, and TELUS Community Investment.

References 

Organizations established in 1983
Medical and health organizations based in Ontario
Organizations for children with health issues